Sesqui 1990 was a festival that was staged in February 1990 in the city of Wellington, New Zealand.  A spectacular commercial and administrative failure,  the Sesqui event has subsequently become an icon of corporate mismanagement within New Zealand popular culture.

History 
Billed by promoters as 'New Zealand's biggest event ever', the festival was staged in Wellington to mark the New Zealand sesquicentenary celebrations, the 150th anniversary of the 1840 signing of the Treaty of Waitangi.  The event was a joint venture between the Wellington Show Association and the Wellington 1990 Trust, a well-funded regional organisation. The Wellington regional and city councils jointly underwrote this event by NZ$1.4 million.  

The Sesqui festival was planned to include a wide range of cultural, trade and scientific exhibits as well as entertainment events and funfair amusements.  It was scheduled to run for six weeks and anticipated to attract 30,000 visitors per day, despite the fact that the population of the entire Wellington region at that time was fewer than 400,000 people. 

Several weeks before the festival was due to begin, the media reported that the Sesqui organisers had decided to stage their opening celebration simultaneously with the opening celebrations of the 1990 New Zealand International Festival of the Arts.  Neither the Sesqui organisers nor the Arts Festival organisers were prepared to alter their plans.

The event 
NZ$150,000 worth of fireworks launched Day 1 of Sesqui 1990. 

The festival organisers had made a decision to split the event between two venues, one at the Wellington Waterfront and the other at the (then) Wellington Show and Sports Centre in Newtown.  Despite the arrangement of a shuttle bus service between these two venues, this decision had the effect of confusing and frustrating potential visitors to the festival, with the result that neither venue attracted visitor numbers beyond an average of 2,500 per day.

The organisers had also adopted a policy against advertising the daily schedules for musical and other performances taking place at either venue.  This policy was based on the assumption that it would encourage visitors to prolong their stay and to make numerous return visits so as not to miss seeing favourite performers. As a result, a number of popular musicians, singers and other entertainers played to largely empty houses because the public did not know when or where they were performing.

Within days of the opening of the festival, media reports began to suggest that it was faltering.  During a heated radio interview, Wellington City Councillor Ruth Gotlieb maintained that it was "every Wellingtonian's civic duty to attend Sesqui."

The highest attendance figure was achieved during the final days of the event, when 32,000 visitors took advantage of a decision to waive all entry fees, which were widely regarded as being excessive. 

Although planned to run for six weeks, Sesqui 1990 closed after only two weeks with debts in excess of NZ$6.4 million.

Aftermath 
The collapse of the Sesqui 1990 festival forced a number of small companies that had been contracted to supply various goods and services to the event into receivership and/or bankruptcy. The Wellington Show Association was liquidated in 1999.

Two iconic billboards promoting Sesqui 1990 remained standing for a number of months after the event's premature closure, apparently because the organisers could not afford to have them removed.  One of these, featuring an image of gleeful Sesqui visitors, was quickly defaced with graffiti reading "And I laughed and laughed and laughed".  The other billboard, a plywood cut-out representing Sesqui mascot "Pesky Sesky" – a sort of anthropomorphic opossum, or possibly sasquatch – had been erected on a rooftop to welcome visitors to the Show and Sports Centre venue, and eventually disappeared during a wind storm.

Other sesquicentenary events fared better, including the New Zealand Sports Hall of Fame, which went on to have a life of its own.

See also
Tuia 250

References

External links
 Defaced banners advertising the failed Sesqui Carnival - Photographs taken by John Nicholson
 

Festivals in Wellington
Regional anniversaries
1990 in New Zealand
History of the Wellington Region
1990 festivals
Cultural festivals in New Zealand
1990s in Wellington